William H. Allen (1858–1936) was an American architect who worked in New Haven, Connecticut. He designed hundreds of houses and other buildings.

Allen, a native of Northampton, Massachusetts, moved to New Haven around 1867 or 1868 and spent most of his adult life there.

He and Richard Williams' Beaux Arts architecture design for the New Haven County Courthouse won a design competition over submissions from several well-known architects. The building, erected in 1914, prominently faces the New Haven Green. 

Several of his works are individually listed on the U.S. National Register of Historic Places (NRHP). Many others are contributing buildings in New Haven's NRHP-listed Whitney Avenue Historic District and other historic districts.

Works include (with attribution):
Fyler-Hotchkiss Estate, 192 Main St. Torrington, CT (Allen, William H.), NRHP-listed
New Haven County Courthouse, 121 Elm St. New Haven, CT (Allen and Williams), NRHP-listed
New York, New Haven and Hartford Railroad general office building, permitted 1892, "a marvelous edifice", demolished
Plymouth Congregational Church, 1469 Chapel St. New Haven, CT (Allen, William H.), NRHP-listed

References

Architects from Massachusetts
Architects from New Haven, Connecticut
People from Northampton, Massachusetts
1858 births
1936 deaths